Novo Celje is a small settlement in the Municipality of Žalec in east-central Slovenia. Its territory is basically the estate of Novo Celje Mansion, a late 18th-century mansion just southeast of Žalec.  The area is part of the traditional region of Styria. The municipality is now included in the Savinja Statistical Region.

History
Novo Celje became a separate settlement in 1999, when its territory was administratively separated from Dobriša Vas.

References

External links
Novo Celje at Geopedia

Populated places in the Municipality of Žalec